Raja Vikrama is a 1950 Indian historical drama film, directed and produced by Kemparaj Urs. The film stars Kemparaj Urs, B. Jayamma, N. S. Subbaiah and M. V. Rajamma. It was simultaneously shot in Tamil and Kannada languages.

Plot

Cast 

Male cast
 Kemparaj Urs as Vikraman
 N. S. Subbaiah as Bangaru
 Stunt Somu as Commander
 Sethuraman as Clown
 C. V. V. Panthulu as King's Adviser
 Ganapathi Bhatt as Good Man
 Mani Iyer as Chandrasena King
 Jayaram as Kalan

Female cast
 B. Jayamma as Prabhavathi
 Rajamma as Kamini
 Pandari Bai as Padmini
 Angamuthu as Female Clown
 Sarathambal as Kamakshi

Soundtrack
Music is composed by S. Rajam. Lyrics were penned by A. M. Nadaraja Kavi. Playback singers are S. Rajam, Ganthimathi and  Jikki.

References 

1950s Kannada-language films
1950s Tamil-language films
Memorials to Vikramaditya